Spring Grove is an unincorporated community in Surry County, Virginia, United States. Spring Grove has a post office with ZIP code 23881.

The Glebe House of Southwark Parish was listed on the National Register of Historic Places in 1976.

References

Unincorporated communities in Surry County, Virginia
Unincorporated communities in Virginia